Rommel at Gazala is a 1986 video game published by Simulations Canada.

Gameplay
Rommel at Gazala is a game that simulates the 1942 Battle of Tobruk of World War II.

Reception
Johnny L. Wilson reviewed the game for Computer Gaming World, and stated that "RAG is a successful utilization of the SimCan design philosophy, but whether it is worth the price is dependent upon whether you buy into that philosophy or not. At least, the specialized requirements of this model fit the SimCan design better than most of their land-based games."

Reviews
Computer Play
Warning Order #16

References

1986 video games
Computer wargames
Cultural depictions of Erwin Rommel
Simulations Canada video games
Turn-based strategy video games
Video games about Nazi Germany
Video games developed in Canada
Video games set in Libya
World War II video games